Kdz. Ereğli Belediye Spor is a women's football team based in the Karadeniz Ereğli district of Zonguldak Province in Turkey. They are associated with Karadeniz Ereğli Belediye Spor Kulübü, a men's side, and play in the Turkish Women's First Football League.

History 
At the end of the 2010–11 season, the team were promoted to the Women's First League after defeating Mersin Camspor in the play-off final match.

The team finished their first season in the Women's First League in the third place. The next season in 2012–13, Kdz. Ereğlispor women repeated their ranking. The 2013–14 season ended for them in the fourth place behind Derince Belediyespor. They finished the 2014–15 season at 5th place. The team's rank for the 2015–16 season was the 6th place.

Stadium 
Kdz. Ereğlispor play their home matches at Beyçayırı Stadium in Karadeniz Ereğli, Zonguldak. The venue, which was renovated in September 2011, has a capacity for 1,300 spectators.

Statistics 
.

(1): Season in discontinued due to COVID-19 pandemic in Turkey
(2): Standing in Group A
(3): Season in progress

Current squad 
.

Head coach:  Günal Taşdemir

Former managers 
  Yıldıray Ağar (2009–2012)
  Ömer Faruk Varlık (2012–2014)
  Necat Bakan (2014–2017)
  Selçuk Akbaş (2017)
  Necat Bakan (2017) 
  Günal Taşdemir (2018)
  Yıldıray Ağar (2019)
  Ömer Faruk Varlık (2019-2022)

Honours
 Turkish Women's Second League
 Runners-up: (1):2008–09
 Third places: (1): 2010–11

 Turkish Women's First League
 Third places: (2): 2011–12, 2012–13

Kit history

Squads

References

External links
Turkish Football Federation website
Kdz. Ereğlispor (women) at UEFA website

Women's football clubs in Turkey
Sport in Zonguldak
Karadeniz Ereğli